Timothy L. Murphy, S.J. (1816–1897) was appointed Santa Clara University's 16th president after the presidency of Walter F. Thornton.

Works

Discovery of America by the Irish Previous to the Ninth Century: With Accounts by Scandinavians and Germans of “Irland It Mikla” and “Vinland Dat Gode.” (1889)

References

Gerald McKevitt, S.J. The University of Santa Clara: A History, 1851-1977 (Page 331)
http://www.scu.edu/president/history/past.cfm

1816 births
1897 deaths
19th-century Irish Jesuits
Presidents of Santa Clara University
Roman Catholic writers
19th-century American clergy